The Syro-Malabar Catholic Eparchy of Bhadravathi was created by Benedict XVI's Papal bull "Cum Ampla" as a suffragan of the Syro-Malabar Catholic Archeparchy of Tellicherry.
The territory of the diocese of Bhadravathi thus includes two civil districts of Karnataka State -  Shimoga and Chikmagalur.

References

Syro-Malabar Catholic dioceses
Christian organizations established in 1999
Christianity in Karnataka
1999 establishments in Karnataka